Artists formerly signed to DreamWorks Records include the following:

A 
AFI
Alien Ant Farm
The All-American Rejects
Jessica Andrews (DreamWorks Nashville)
Lisa Angelle (DreamWorks Nashville)
The Apex Theory
Asleep at the Wheel

B 
Tori Baxley (DreamWorks Nashville)
Blackstreet
Blinker the Star
Boomkat
Tamar Braxton
Buckcherry

C 
Canela
Josh Clayton-Felt
Citizen Cope
Dan Colehour (DreamWorks Nashville)
Creeper Lagoon
Cupcakes
Jason Cuba
Chris Rock

D 
Linda Davis (DreamWorks Nashville)
Deadly Venoms
Deadsy
Roxie Dean (DreamWorks Nashville)
Dr. Octagon

E 
eastmountainsouth
Eels
Scotty Emerick (DreamWorks Nashville)
Emerson Drive (DreamWorks Nashville)
Elliott Smith

F 
Jimmy Fallon
 Rick Ferrell (DreamWorks Nashville)
Floetry
John Fogerty
Forest for the Trees
Kim Fox
Jeff Foxworthy (DreamWorks Nashville)
Nelly Furtado

H 
Hanna-McEuen (DreamWorks Nashville)
Eric Heatherly (DreamWorks Nashville)
Hem
Dave Hollister
Hot Apple Pie (DreamWorks Nashville)

I 
 The Isley Brothers

J 
Joanna Janét (DreamWorks Nashville)
Maria Jensen
Jimmy Eat World
Jolie & The Wanted (DreamWorks Nashville)
Jonathan Fire*Eater
JS
Jud Mahoney

K 
Toby Keith (DreamWorks Nashville)
Kina

L 
Tracy Lawrence (DreamWorks Nashville)
 Leisure (see Middle Class Rut)
Len
Lifehouse
Living Things
Long Beach Dub Allstars
Loudermilk
Leslie Carter ("Like Wow!" shelved before being released.)

M 
Mac McAnally (DreamWorks Nashville)
Maria
George Michael (US and Canada)
Morphine
Jessy Moss

N 
Randy Newman
The Nitty Gritty Dirt Band (DreamWorks Nashville)
N-Toon

O 
Orpheus
Ours

P 
Papa Roach
Danielle Peck (DreamWorks Nashville)
Michelle Poe (DreamWorks Nashville)
Powerman 5000
Pressure 4-5
Propellerheads

R 
Redmon & Vale (DreamWorks Nashville)
Johnny Reid (DreamWorks Nashville)
Chris Rock
Rollins Band

S 
Saves the Day
Shane Sellers (DreamWorks Nashville)
Erick Sermon
Elliott Smith
Solé
Soluna
Sparta
Swizz Beatz
Self

T 
Chalee Tennison (DreamWorks Nashville)
Randy Travis (DreamWorks Nashville)
Sisely Treasure

W 
Mike Walker (DreamWorks Nashville)
Jimmy Wayne (DreamWorks Nashville)
Rufus Wainwright
John Williams
Darryl Worley (DreamWorks Nashville)

DreamWorks